In algebraic topology, a branch of mathematics, the path space  of a based space  is the space that consists of all maps  from the interval  to X such that , called paths.

The natural map  is a fibration called the path space fibration.

References

Further reading 
https://ncatlab.org/nlab/show/path+space

Algebraic topology
Mathematics